Coleothrix longicosta is a species of snout moth in the genus Coleothrix. It was described by Yanli Du, Shimei Song and Chunsheng Wu in 2007. It is found in China (Zhejiang, Hubei, Hunan, Jiangxi, Fujian, Sichuan, Guangxi, Guizhou, Yunan, Hainan), Japan, Burma, India, Sri Lanka, Borneo, Malaysia, Sumatra, Bali, Sulawesi and the Philippines.

The wingspan is 15-16.5 mm. The forewings are reddish fuscous to blackish fuscous and three times as long as wide. The hindwings are semi-translucent, the veins and fringe are darker.

Etymology
The specific name refers to the long costa in male genitalia.

References

Moths described in 2007
Phycitinae